Yiğit Özşener (born 6 April 1972) is a Turkish actor.

Biography 
His family originates on paternal side from Turkish immigrants in Kavala (Ottoman Empire, now in Greece), and on maternal side from Turkish immigrants in Skopje, Macedonia. Özşener graduated from Yıldız Technical University with a degree in Electronics and Communications Engineering in 1996. Özşener, who had begun studying acting at the Şahika Tekand acting studio, began acting there in various plays, including Harold Pinter's The Dumb Waiter, which was directed by Şahika Tekand herself.

He gained national attention for appearing as the "Özgür Çocuk" (Free Child) with singer Nil Karaibrahimgil in a series of commercials for Turkcell and Nil Karaibrahimgil's music video "Ben Özgürüm". He appeared in the series Karanlıkta Koşanlar with Uğur Yücel. Then he acted in the series Üzgünüm Leyla.

Between 2007 and 2009, he played Cemil Paşazade in the series Dudaktan Kalbe adapted from Reşat Nuri Güntekin's classic novel. Since 2009, he played Cengiz Atay in the hit revenge series Ezel. His crime series "Son" was sold to USA, France, Spain, Russian, Netherlands for adaptation. Due to Nejat İşler left "Rüzgar" role, he started to play as "Rüzgar" with Beren Saat in second season of İntikam which Turkish remake of "Revenge". He had guest roles in Galip Derviş Turkish version of "Monk" and popular series Cesur ve Güzel, "Kırmızı Oda", "10 Bin Adım".

He played crime series "Bozkır" and "Ramo". He played in historical series "Yüzyıllık Mühür", "Barbaroslar: Akdeniz'in Kılıcı". He played in series "Cezailer" about Rosenhan experiment.

During his cinema career, he played in many hit films. He had parts in films such as O Şimdi Asker, Gece 11:45 and Beş Vakit. In 2011, he appeared in the film series Aşk Tesadüfleri Sever (Love Likes Coincidences) and starred as Mete Avunduk in the film Kaybedenler Kulübü (The Losers' Club) about the 1990s cult radio show of the same name. He played in period film "Dedemin İnsanları" and "Güneşi Gördüm". With Dudaktan Kalbe's co-star Aslı Tandoğan, he played in film "Bir Kahramanın Rüyası" twice.

Filmography

References

External links 
 

1972 births
Living people
Actors from İzmir
Turkish male film actors
Turkish male stage actors
Turkish male television actors
21st-century Turkish male actors
20th-century Turkish male actors